Winfred King (born June 12, 1961) is an American retired professional basketball player.

Early years and college
Born in Atlanta, Georgia, Winfred King attended North Fulton School.  His career high (points) game was 26 points, his coach was Glen Gleaton.

Anderson
King spent two seasons as a member of the Anderson Ravens; his coach was John Edwards.

Indiana State
King spent the 1981-82 season as a member of the Indiana State team, his coach was Dave Schellhase. King started 12 games, averaged 11.6 points and 7.5 rebounds per game.

East Tennessee
In 1983, his senior season, King led the 1982-83 East Tennessee team to a record of 22-9 and berth in the NIT, his coach was Barry Dowd. He was named to the All-Southern Conference second-team as he averaged 15.2 points per game and led the conference with 10.3 rebounds per game. The Buccaneers lost to Vanderbilt in the first round of the 1983 NIT.

Professional career

Boston Celtics
Winfred King was selected as the 52nd overall pick in the 1983 NBA Draft by the Boston Celtics. He did not appear in any regular season NBA games as he was injured late in the pre-season, the Celtics placed him on the injured reserve and he went on to a successful multi-year career in the Italian and Spanish leagues.  He finished his career during the 1992–93 season with Maccabi Tel Aviv B.C.

European leagues
He won the 1986 Galicia Cup with CB Breogán in the Spanish League.

External links
College stats @ sports-reference
International stats @ basketball-reference

References

1961 births
Living people
American expatriate basketball people in Israel
American expatriate basketball people in Italy
American expatriate basketball people in Spain
American men's basketball players
Anderson Ravens men's basketball players
Basketball players from Atlanta
Boston Celtics draft picks
CB Breogán players
Centers (basketball)
East Tennessee State Buccaneers men's basketball players
Indiana State Sycamores men's basketball players
Maccabi Tel Aviv B.C. players
Nuova Pallacanestro Gorizia players
Pallalcesto Amatori Udine players